Nikolaos Dobros (born 24 May 1993) is a German-Greek footballer who plays as a midfielder for FC Nöttingen.

References

External links
 
 

Living people
1993 births
People from Filderstadt
Sportspeople from Stuttgart (region)
German footballers
Greek footballers
Footballers from Baden-Württemberg
Association football midfielders
3. Liga players
Luxembourg National Division players
FC Ingolstadt 04 II players
FC Nöttingen players
Kickers Offenbach players
SC Paderborn 07 players
SV Elversberg players
F91 Dudelange players
Wormatia Worms players
VfR Aalen players
Stuttgarter Kickers players
German expatriate footballers
German expatriate sportspeople in Luxembourg
Expatriate footballers in Luxembourg